This is a list of New Zealand television related events from 2004.

Events
January–February - The New Zealand version of Pop Idol debuts on TV2.
10 May - Ben Lummis wins the first series of New Zealand Idol.
22 September - bro'Town the very first New Zealand animated comedy series for adults premieres on TV3.
Long running British children's animated series Peppa Pig begins airing in New Zealand for the very first time on TV3.
American animated sitcom The Simpsons switches over to air on TV3.

Debuts

Domestic
January - New Zealand Idol (TV2) (2004-2006)
22 March - Studio 2 LIVE (TV2) (2004-2010)
22 September - bro'Town (TV3) (2004-2009)
 2 November- Close Up (TV One) (2004-2012)
Unknown - The Insider's Guide To Happiness (2004)
Unknown - Border Patrol (TV One) (2004-present)

International
Unknown -  The Berenstain Bears (2003) (TV3)
Unknown -  Peppa Pig (TV3)
Unknown -  Winx Club (TV3)
Unknown -  Duck Dodgers (TV2)
Unknown -  Transformers: Energon (TV2)
Unknown -  Lilo & Stitch: The Series (TV2)
Unknown -  Little Red Tractor (TV3)
Unknown -  Joan of Arcadia (TV3)
Unknown -  Astro Boy (2003) (TV3)
Unknown -  The Pitts (TV3)
Unknown -  The O.C. (TV2)
Unknown -  Happy Family (TV2)
Unknown -  One Tree Hill (TV2)
Unknown -  Two and a Half Men (TV2)
Unknown -  Queer Eye for the Straight Girl (TV2)
Unknown -  Dream Job (TV2)
Unknown -  Bridezillas (TV2)
Unknown -  Xiaolin Showdown (TV2)
Unknown -  Jake 2.0 (TV3)
Unknown -  Survivor: All-Stars (TV2)
Unknown -  Ratz (TV3)

Changes to network affiliation
This is a list of programs which made their premiere on a New Zealand television network that had previously premiered on another New Zealand television network. The networks involved in the switch of allegiances are predominantly both free-to-air networks or both subscription television networks. Programs that have their free-to-air/subscription television premiere, after previously premiering on the opposite platform (free-to air to subscription/subscription to free-to air) are not included. In some cases, programs may still air on the original television network. This occurs predominantly with programs shared between subscription television networks.

International

Television shows
 What Now (1981-present)
 Shortland Street (1992-present)
 Squirt (1996-2006)
 Breakfast (1997-present)
 Target (1999-2013)
 Mitre 10 Dream Home (1999-present)
 Street Legal (2000-2005)
 Piha Rescue (2001, 2003–2017)
 My House My Castle (2001-2009, 2011)
 Police Ten 7 (2002-present)
 Sticky TV (2002-2017)
 Eating Media Lunch (2003-2008)
 bro'Town (2004-2009)
 Saturday Disney (2004-2006)
 Border Patrol (2004-present)
 Studio 2 LIVE (2004-2010)

Ending this year
19 March - Mercy Peak (TV One) (2001-2004)
November - Holmes (TV One (1989-2004)

Births

Deaths